Cyprus competed at the 2016 Summer Olympics in Rio de Janeiro, Brazil, from 5 to 21 August 2016. This was the nation's tenth consecutive appearance at the Summer Olympics.

Cyprus Olympic Committee sent a team of 16 athletes, 10 men and 6 women, to compete in seven different sports at the Games. The nation's full roster in Rio de Janeiro was slightly larger by three athletes than those sent to London 2012. Among the sporting events represented by the nation's athletes, Cyprus made its Olympic debut in artistic gymnastics and women's road cycling.

The Cypriot delegation featured six returning Olympians, with only four of them having participated in more than two editions of the Olympic Games, including high jumper Kyriakos Ioannou, sprinter Eleni Artymata, 33-year-old windsurfer Andreas Cariolou (the oldest and most experienced competitor of the team), and Laser sailor Pavlos Kontides, who won a silver medal in London four years earlier. The nation's first ever Olympic medalist, and one of the potential frontrunners for gold in the Laser class at his third Games, Kontides was selected to lead the Cypriot team as the flag bearer in the opening ceremony.

Unlike the previous Olympics, Cyprus failed to earn a single medal in Rio de Janeiro. Kontides, Ioannou, and Serbian-born hurdler Milan Trajkovic came close to adding another medal for Cyprus at these Games, but finished seventh in the finals of their respective sporting events.

Athletics

Cypriot athletes have so far achieved qualifying standards in the following athletics events (up to a maximum of 3 athletes in each event):

Track & road events

Field events

Cycling

Road
Cyprus has qualified one rider in the women's Olympic road race by virtue of her top 100 individual placement in the 2016 UCI World Rankings.

Gymnastics

Artistic
Cyprus has entered one artistic gymnast for the first time into the Olympic competition. Marios Georgiou had claimed his Olympic spot in the men's apparatus and all-around events at the Olympic Test Event in Rio de Janeiro.

Men

Sailing

Cypriot sailors have qualified one boat in each of the following classes through the 2014 ISAF Sailing World Championships, the individual fleet Worlds, and European qualifying regattas.

M = Medal race; EL = Eliminated – did not advance into the medal race

Shooting
 
Cyprus has qualified one shooter each in the men's and women's skeet by virtue of their best finishes at the 2015 ISSF World Cup series, and the World Shotgun Championships, as long as they obtained a minimum qualifying score (MQS) by 31 March 2016.

Qualification Legend: Q = Qualify for the next round; q = Qualify for the bronze medal (shotgun)

Swimming

Cyprus has received a Universality invitation from FINA to send two swimmers (one male and one female) to the Olympics.

Weightlifting

Cyprus has qualified one male weightlifter for the Olympics by virtue of his top 15 individual finish, among those who had not secured any quota places through the World or European Championships, in the IWF World Rankings as of 20 June 2016. The place was awarded to Greek-born Antonis Martasidis in the men's middleweight division (85 kg).

On 25 July 2016, Martasidis was ejected from the Games, after testing positive for the banned substance.

References

External links 

 

Olympics
2016
Nations at the 2016 Summer Olympics